Reggiolo is a town in the province of Reggio Emilia, Emilia-Romagna, Italy. As of 31 December 2016 Reggiolo had an estimated population of 9,192. Carlo Ancelotti, the famous football manager, is a native of the town, and Formula One racer Lorenzo Bandini's funeral was held here.

Twin towns
Reggiolo is twinned with:

  Niardo, Italy, since 2012

Sources

Cities and towns in Emilia-Romagna